Padmanabha Balakrishna Acharya (born 8 October 1931) is an Indian politician who was the Governor of Manipur, from 27 June 2019 to 23 July 2019 and Governor of Nagaland, from 19 July 2014 to 31 July 2019, also Governor of Arunachal Pradesh, from 28 January 2017 to 3 October 2017 and Governor of Tripura, from 21 July 2014 to 19 May 2015.

Early life and education

He is the son of Balakrishna and Radha Acharya. He was born in Udupi district in Karnataka, India. He completed his matriculation from Christian High School, Udupi. He studied at the Mahatma Gandhi Memorial College (MGM College), Udupi in 1949. After graduation, he worked in Mumbai and was associated with Akhil Bharatiya Vidyarthi Parishad (ABVP) and was a member of Mumbai University's senate. He also completed LL.B degree from Mumbai University. He was credited with planning the University of Delhi's Gyanodaya Express college on wheels to North East India.

Career

He had held various positions in the Bharatiya Janata Party (BJP) before becoming governor. In 1980, Shree P.B. Acharya joined the Bharatiya Janata Party. He was elected the BJP President of North West Bombay District in 1987 and later in 1989 became a committee member of the Mumbai BJP. In 1991, he was elected a national executive member of BJP in charge of the North Eastern States namely: Arunachal Pradesh, Manipur, Meghalaya, Mizoram and Nagaland of India. He was also all India national secretary of the BJP and in-charge of North Eastern States from 1995-2002. In 2002, he was the national executive member with the charge of Kerala & Lakshadweep and in 2005 of Tamil Nadu. Acharya was the national in charge of SC/ST Morcha and co-convenor of the Overseas Friends of BJP and the National Prabhari of North East India Samparka Cell. Acharya was actively engaged in My Home is India a project of ABVP for the tribal children from the North East, who were invited by the families of Mumbai city for educational purposes. Several students lived at his residence for several years (1969-79). He was involved in the activities (since 1975) of the Academy for Indian Tribal Dialects at Rani Ma Gaidinliu Bhavan – a publication wing of INFC and published 10 booklets on Tribal Nationalist leaders like Rani Gaidinliu (Manipur), U.Tirot Singh and Jaban Bay (Meghalaya), Dr. Dying Ering and Narottam (Arunachal Pradesh) and also publication of tribal proverbs, folk-tales and poems.

Governorship
Mr. Acharya was appointed Governor of Nagaland on 14 July 2014 after President Pranab Mukherjee accepted the resignation of Tripura Governor Vakkom Purushothaman.
   His term as Governor ended in July 2019.
 
Between 12 December 2014 and 17 August 2016, Sri Acharya held additional charge as Governor of Assam.  
He was also the Governor of Tripura state of India from 21 July 2014 to 19 May 2015. He was also given additional charge as the Governor of Arunachal Pradesh state of India on 26 January 2017. 

He was also given additional charge as the Governor of Manipur in the absence of Najma Heptulla for a few weeks in July 2019.

Gallery

References

|-

|-

|-

1931 births
Living people
Governors of Nagaland
Governors of Assam
Governors of Tripura
People from Udupi district
University of Mumbai alumni
Bharatiya Janata Party politicians from Karnataka